Strikeforce: Henderson vs. Babalu II, was a mixed martial arts event that was held by Strikeforce on December 4, 2010 at the Scottrade Center in St Louis, Missouri, United States.

Background
The winner of the Sobral-Henderson bout was promised the next shot at Rafael Cavalcante's Light Heavyweight Championship.

Undercard matches featured four protegees from Strikeforce's Fighter Exchange Program. The Fighter Exchange Program is intended to be a tie-in to the Career Mode of the EA Sports MMA game, and features multimedia documentation of four young prospects (Bettega, Cummins, Martytniuok, Phillips) traveling, learning, and training with four established veterans (Jacare Souza, Jason Miller, Gegard Mousasi, Luke Rockhold). These matches were streamed live at Sherdog.com.

Herschel Walker pulled out of his fight with Scott Carson due to a cut under his left eye. The bout was moved to January's Strikeforce: Diaz vs. Cyborg card, where Walker defeated Carson by first round TKO.

Scott Smith was originally slated to take on Jesse Finney at this event, but would instead face the debuting Paul Daley on this same card. Before a replacement opponent could be named, Finney withdrew from the card himself due to an eye injury.

Valentijn Overeem also pulled out of a bout with Antônio Silva after suffering an elbow injury. Mike Kyle stepped in to replace Overeem.

This was the first Strikeforce event where 4 main card fights ended in a knockout.

The event drew an estimated 341,000 viewers, with a peak at 465,000 on Showtime.

Results

See also
 Strikeforce (mixed martial arts)
 List of Strikeforce champions
 List of Strikeforce events
 2010 in Strikeforce

References

External links
 

Henderson vs. Babalu II
Mixed martial arts in Missouri
Events in St. Louis
Sports competitions in St. Louis
2010 in mixed martial arts
2010 in sports in Missouri

ja:Strikeforce: Henderson vs. Babalu